Towthorpe could be a community in England:

Towthorpe, East Riding of Yorkshire
Towthorpe, York